William Cecil Marshall (29 April 1849 – 24 January 1921) was an architect and amateur tennis player, known for finishing runner-up in the very first Wimbledon tournament to Spencer Gore in 1877. He was an original member of the Art Workers' Guild.

W.C. Marshall was a defensive player who was no match for the aggressive Gore in the final, the Wimbledon local winning 6–1, 6–2, 6–4 in 48 minutes. There was a formally dressed crowd of about 200 who paid a shilling each to stand and watch; there were no bleachers. A field of 22 competitors assembled to play and had to finish by Thursday because an important cricket match was scheduled for Friday.

He also reached the third round in the 1879 tournament where he was defeated by eventual champion John Hartley.

He married Margaret Anna Lloyd and had six children. His daughter, Frances Partridge, well-known for her connections with the Bloomsbury Group, was a diarist.

Grand Slam finals

Singles: 1 (1 runner-up)

References

1849 births
1921 deaths
19th-century English people
19th-century male tennis players
English male tennis players
British male tennis players
Tennis people from Greater London